"Secret Smile" is a song by American rock band Semisonic. The single, released to American radio on January 11, 1999, gained the band brief international popularity. A live version of the song recorded at The Gorge Amphitheatre, as well as a mix by The Orb had previously been released as a B-side to "Singing in My Sleep". The song was featured in the film Simply Irresistible and in the TV series Charmed and Dawson's Creek.

Composition
Songwriter Dan Wilson has said that the melody for the song came to him in a dream, and he woke up in the middle of the night, rushed to a piano, and wrote it down.

"...Secret Smile, the first half of it came to me in a dream. I woke up in very early morning hours with this song playing in my head. I got up, ran to a piano, and I wrote down the words that I heard in my mind and I played the chords on the piano and wrote down the names of the chords. Then I went back to sleep. And then the next day when I woke up, I remembered the song from the dream. I went to the piano and I saw my notes. I played the song and I thought, Well, this is great. It must be some song that I've heard before. Then I asked all my friends about it, and they all said, 'No, that sounds like a song of yours.'"

Music video
The music video was shot in Los Angeles in January 1999 and was directed by British music video director Sophie Muller.

Track listings

US promo CD
"Secret Smile" (radio edit—no beat box in bridge) – 3:46
"Secret Smile" (remix edit—beat box in bridge) – 3:46
"Secret Smile" (album edit) – 3:45
"Secret Smile" (remix full version) – 4:46

UK CD1
"Secret Smile" (remix edit) – 3:45
"Completely Pleased" – 3:17
"Erotic City" – 3:34

UK CD2
"Secret Smile" (album edit) – 3:45
"Singing in My Sleep" (remix full version) – 4:28
"Take Me with You" (live) – 4:08
"Secret Smile" (video)

UK cassette single
"Secret Smile" (album edit) – 3:45
"Take Me with You" (live) – 4:08

European CD single
"Secret Smile" – 3:46
"Completely Pleased" – 3:19

Australasian CD single
"Secret Smile" – 3:46
"Completely Pleased" – 3:19
"Erotic City" – 3:35
"Secret Smile" (full-length remix) – 4:27

Personnel
Personnel are lifted from the US promo CD liner notes.
Dan Wilson – writing
Nick Launay – production
Bob Clearmountain – mixing (album version)
Tom Lord-Alge – mixing (remix)
Bob Ludwig – mastering
Jennifer Munson – digital editing
Jim Grant – management

Charts

Certifications

Release history

References

1998 songs
1999 singles
MCA Records singles
Music videos directed by Sophie Muller
Semisonic songs
Song recordings produced by Nick Launay
Songs written by Dan Wilson (musician)